Hernandes Rodrigues da Silva, commonly known as Hernandes Rodrigues or simply Hernandes, is a Brazilian professional footballer who plays as a left-winger, right-winger and striker for K League 1 club Incheon United FC, on loan from Grêmio.

Club career

Grêmio
Born in Porto Nacional, Brazil, Hernandes Rodrigues joined the Grêmio's Academy at the age of 18 in 2019.

Career statistics

Club

References

External links

1999 births
Living people
Brazilian footballers
Brazilian expatriate footballers
Association football forwards
K League 2 players
Associação Desportiva São Caetano players
Grêmio Foot-Ball Porto Alegrense players
Jeonnam Dragons players
Gyeongnam FC  players
Brazilian expatriate sportspeople in South Korea
Expatriate footballers in South Korea
Sportspeople from Tocantins